The white-browed forest flycatcher (Fraseria cinerascens) is a species of bird in the family Muscicapidae.

It is found throughout the intra-tropical rainforest of Sub-Saharan Africa.

Its natural habitats are subtropical or tropical moist lowland forest and subtropical or tropical swamps.

References

white-browed forest flycatcher
Birds of Sub-Saharan Africa
white-browed forest flycatcher
Taxonomy articles created by Polbot